Rafael Payare (born 23 February 1980) is a Venezuelan conductor.

Background
Born in Puerto la Cruz, Venezuela, Payare's parents were Trina Torres de Payare, an elementary school teacher, and Juan R. Payare, a cartographer for the city. He and his brother Joel each joined El Sistema. Payare eventually became principal horn of the Simón Bolívar Symphony Orchestra.

In 2004, Payare began conducting studies with José Antonio Abreu. He won first prize at the Malko Competition for Young Conductors in May 2012,  He subsequently became an assistant conductor to Claudio Abbado during Abbado's work with the Simón Bolívar Symphony Orchestra, and to Daniel Barenboim at the Staatsoper Berlin.

In October 2013, Payare first guest-conducted the Ulster Orchestra.  On the basis of this appearance, the orchestra announced his appointment as its 13th chief conductor, effective with the 2014–2015 season, his first lead orchestral post. In October 2016, the orchestra announced a contract extension through the 2018–2019 season, and also a change in his title from chief conductor to music director. In February 2018, the orchestra announced the scheduled conclusion of his music directorship at the close of the 2018-2019 season.  Payare now has the title of conductor laureate of the orchestra.

In the United States, Payare worked as an assistant to Lorin Maazel at the Castleton Festival. Following Maazel's death in 2014, Payare became principal conductor of the festival in 2015. In January 2018, Payare first guest-conducted the San Diego Symphony.  On the basis of this concert, the San Diego Symphony named Payare as its next music director, effective 1 July 2019 with an initial four-year contract.  Payare assumed the title of music director-designate with immediate effect.  In October 2020, the San Diego Symphony announced an extension of Payare's contract as music director through the 2025-2026 season.

Payare first guest-conducted the Orchestre Symphonique de Montréal (OSM) in 2018.  He returned as a guest conductor of the OSM in 2019.  In January 2021, the OSM announced the appointment of Payare as its next music director, effective with the 2022-2023 season, with an initial contract of 5 seasons.  He held the title of music director-designate for the 2021-2022 season.

Payare and the American cellist Alisa Weilerstein married on 18 August 2013. The couple have a daughter, and reside in Berlin.

References

External links
 Askonas Holt agency page on Rafael Payare

Venezuelan conductors (music)
Male conductors (music)
Venezuelan classical musicians
21st-century conductors (music)
1980 births
Living people
21st-century male musicians
People from Puerto la Cruz